Illiopolis Township is located in Sangamon County, Illinois. As of the 2010 census, its population was 1,314 and it contained 555 housing units.

See also
 Sangamon Ordnance Plant, located in the township.

Geography

Demographics

References

External links

 US Census
 City-data.com
 Illinois State Archives

Townships in Sangamon County, Illinois
Springfield metropolitan area, Illinois
Townships in Illinois